Anju Dhillon (born 1979)  is a Canadian Liberal politician, who was elected to represent the riding of Dorval—Lachine—LaSalle in the House of Commons of Canada in the 2015 federal election. She is the first person of South Asian descent to be elected from the province of Quebec.

Dhillon was born and raised in Montreal, and began volunteering for Paul Martin's campaigns at age 13.  For ten years she was vice-president (female) for youth of the federal liberal riding association in LaSalle-Émard, and was subsequently its vice-president (female). Dhillon attended Concordia University, earning a Bachelor of Arts in political science. She then studied law at Université de Montréal and became the first Canadian Sikh to practice law in Quebec.

Electoral record

References

External links
 Official Website

Living people
Canadian Sikhs
Canadian women lawyers
Women members of the House of Commons of Canada
Concordia University alumni
Lawyers from Montreal
Liberal Party of Canada MPs
Members of the House of Commons of Canada from Quebec
Politicians from Montreal
People from LaSalle, Quebec
Université de Montréal alumni
Women in Quebec politics
21st-century Canadian politicians
21st-century Canadian women politicians
Canadian politicians of Indian descent
1979 births